Ray Galbraith Fisher (26 November 1940 – 31 August 2011) was a Scottish folk singer. The Scotsman has called her "perhaps the best-known Scots folksinger of her generation", and The Guardian, "one of Britain's great interpreters of traditional song".

Early life
Ray Galbraith Fisher was born on 26 November 1940 at Redlands Hospital, Glasgow, the second of six daughters and third of seven children of John Fisher, a police inspector, and his wife, Morag Fisher (born Marion Macdonald). Her father sang as a soloist in the City of Glasgow police choir, and her mother sang in Scots Gaelic.

She was educated at Hyndland Secondary School, as was her brother Archie, and it was where she met Hamish Imlach, followed by Jordanhill Teacher Training College.

Career
Fisher began in the 1950s with a skiffle group alongside her brother Archie, before they became a folk duo, Ray and Archie Fisher. They were regulars at Norman Buchan's Glasgow Ballads Club, and it was through Buchan and his wife Janie, that Ray met Jeannie Robertson, who invited her to stay in Aberdeen, where she then spent six weeks learning about traditional Scottish folk songs.

Ray and Archie later formed a trio, The Wayfarers, with singer/fiddler Bobby Campbell, and the Fisher Family, with their parents, their younger sister Cilla, and later Cilla's husband Artie Trezise. Ray and Archie both also had solo careers.

She was a familiar bespectacled face on television music programmes, and appeared on BBC's Jools' Annual Hootenanny and STV's Here and Now.

Fisher released only three solo albums, The Bonny Birdie (1972), Willie's Lady (1982), and Traditional Songs of Scotland (1991).

Personal life
On 3 September 1962, Fisher married Colin Ross (1934–2019), a schoolteacher, fiddler and Northumbrian piper, and they had three children: Andrew (born 1964), Duncan (born 1963) and Fiona (born 1966).

She died from cancer on 31 August 2011 in North Shields, Tyne and Wear, aged 70.

References

1940 births
2011 deaths
Scottish folk singers
Musicians from Glasgow
Scottish songwriters
People educated at Hyndland Secondary School
20th-century Scottish women singers